Dušan Petković (born 13 June 1974) is a Serbian former footballer who played as a defender.

Club career
After starting out in his homeland, Petković went on to play professionally in Spain (Mallorca), Japan (Yokohama Marinos), Germany (VfL Wolfsburg and 1. FC Nürnberg), and Russia (Spartak Moscow and Saturn Ramenskoye).

International career
Petković represented Yugoslavia at under-18 level before the country dissolved in 1992.

Between 2000 and 2004, Petković was capped seven times for Serbia and Montenegro (previously known as FR Yugoslavia). He was additionally called up to Serbia and Montenegro's 2006 FIFA World Cup squad, as a replacement for the injured Mirko Vučinić, but withdrew from the roster following media criticism of the fact that it was his father who selected him.

Personal life
Petković is the son of fellow footballer Ilija Petković.

In November 2022, Petković and his stepson Damjan Roganović were arrested in Amsterdam, suspected of the  criminal offenses of cocaine distribution as a part of an organized criminal group.

Career statistics

Club

International

Honours
Spartak Moscow
 Russian Super Cup: Runner-up 2004
OFK Beograd
 Serbia and Montenegro Cup: Runner-up 2005–06

Notes

References

External links
 
 
 
 

1. FC Nürnberg players
Association football defenders
Bundesliga players
Expatriate footballers in Germany
Expatriate footballers in Japan
Expatriate footballers in Russia
Expatriate footballers in Spain
FC Saturn Ramenskoye players
FC Spartak Moscow players
First League of Serbia and Montenegro players
FK Spartak Subotica players
J1 League players
OFK Beograd players
RCD Mallorca players
Russian Premier League players
Segunda División players
Serbia and Montenegro expatriate footballers
Serbia and Montenegro expatriate sportspeople in Germany
Serbia and Montenegro expatriate sportspeople in Japan
Serbia and Montenegro expatriate sportspeople in Russia
Serbia and Montenegro expatriate sportspeople in Spain
Serbia and Montenegro footballers
Serbia and Montenegro international footballers
Serbian expatriate footballers
Serbian expatriate sportspeople in Russia
Serbian footballers
Footballers from Belgrade
VfL Wolfsburg players
Yokohama F. Marinos players
Yugoslav First League players
1974 births
Living people